Kountze Independent School District is a public school district based in Kountze, Texas (USA).

In addition to Kountze, the district serves the unincorporated community of Honey Island and part of  Wildwood.

Dr. Shane Reyenga currently serves as the district's superintendent. The Board of Trustees consists of: Steve Eppes, Missy Jennings, Brandon Kunk, Brandon Laird, Don McDonald, Jason McDonald, and Susie Wilson.

Schools
Kountze Elementary: Pre-K through 2nd Grade
Kountze Intermediate: 3rd through 5th Grade 
Kountze (or Penland) Middle: 6th through 8th Grade
Kountze High: 9th through 12th Grade

References

External links
Kountze ISD

School districts in Hardin County, Texas